Super, Girls!, directed by Jian Yi, is a 2007 independent Chinese documentary that follows 10 female teenagers on their quest to become instant superstars on China's biggest television show.  The Chinese equivalent of American Idol, the "Super Girls Singing Contest" spawned an unprecedented pop culture phenomenon. Drawing over 400 million viewers, the ending text of the documentary implies the show was cancelled by the Chinese government for political reasons.  The film accesses the contestants’ lives over several months. Through interviews and footage of auditions and competitions, Super, Girls! examines sexuality and success in the new China.

Awards
 Official Selection - Cambridge Film Festival
 Official Selection - Minneapolis-St. Paul International Film Festival
Documentary Fortnight, Museum of Modern Art, New York, March 2009
Brooklyn Academy of Art, New York, April 2009
Chinese Independent Film Festival, Kathmandu, Nepal, 2011

External links
 Super, Girls! for Home and Institutional Use Download
 
 Super, Girls! Review - by Nelson Kim, Hammer to Nail
 Super, Girls! Review - by Ronnie Schreib, Variety
 “Super Girls” in China: Holy Gender Bending! - by Angela Ellis, NPR, May 9, 2008

2007 films
Chinese documentary films
2007 documentary films
2000s Mandarin-language films
Television in China
Documentary films about television